Hexacontium pachydermum is a species in the genus Hexacontium of the family Actinommidae. It was described by Eugen Honoratius Jørgensen in 1899.

References 

Radiolarian families
Polycystines